The Jamunkhadi Simsar or Jamunkhadi Wetlands is a wetlands conservation project in the Kankai municipality of Jhapa District, in eastern Nepal.

It was created to be developed as a tourist destination in Wards 2 and 5 of Surunga VDC (which are now the Dandagau area of Kankai), within the community forest.  It lies about a kilometer away from the East-West Highway and occupies an area of about 10 hectares of the 25-hectare community forest. Originally, it included two ponds named after the rivers Ganga (Ganges) and Jamuna, but due to lack of protection, Ganga no longer exists and currently only Jamuna remains.

Jamuna pond is a tourist attraction. There is boating and fishing on the pond.  Wild animals such as the python, bear, sambar, and porcupine are protected in this area.

Tourism

References

External links
website

Tourist attractions in Nepal
Jhapa District